, or A-net, was an airline based on the grounds of Tokyo International Airport in Ōta, Tokyo, Japan.

It operated feeder services for parent Air Nippon, itself a subsidiary of All Nippon Airways (ANA). Its main base was New Chitose Airport.  On October 1, 2010, Air Nippon Network, Air Next and Air Central were merged and rebranded as ANA Wings.

History 

The airline was established in May 2001 to operate Air Nippon's local feeder routes from Tokyo and Sapporo. It started operations on 1 July 2002 using three Bombardier Dash 8 aircraft. In December 2003 4 more Dash 8s joined to replace Boeing 737 aircraft operated from Osaka by Air Nippon.

In April 2004 Air Nippon Network was headquartered in Higashi-ku, Sapporo, Hokkaido.

Air Nippon Network had 400 employees (at March 2007).

Destinations 
Domestic destinations included:

Hokkaidō 
 Hakodate (Hakodate Airport)
 Kushiro (Kushiro Airport)
 Memanbetsu (Memanbetsu Airport)
 Nakashibetsu (Nakashibetsu Airport)
 Sapporo (New Chitose Airport)
 Wakkanai (Wakkanai Airport)

Kantō 
 Tokyo (Haneda Airport)
 Miyakejima (Miyakejima Airport)
 Ōshima (Oshima Airport)

Kansai 
 Hyōgo Prefecture
 Osaka International Airport is partly in Hyōgo Prefecture and partly in Osaka Prefecture
 Osaka Prefecture
 Osaka
 Osaka International Airport (Itami) is partly in Hyōgo Prefecture and partly in Osaka Prefecture
 Kansai International Airport

Tōhoku 
 Akita Prefecture
 Ōdate-Noshiro (Odate-Noshiro Airport)

Chūbu 
 Niigata Prefecture
 Niigata (Niigata Airport)

Chūgoku 
 Shimane Prefecture
 Iwami/Hagi, Yamaguchi Prefecture (Iwami Airport)

Shikoku 
 Ehime Prefecture
 Matsuyama (Matsuyama Airport)
 Kōchi Prefecture
 Kōchi (Kōchi Ryōma Airport)

Kyūshū 
 Fukuoka Prefecture
 Fukuoka (Fukuoka Airport)
 Saga Prefecture
 Saga (Saga Airport)

Okinawa 
 Naha Airport

International destinations included

Fleet 

The Air Nippon Network fleet consisted of the following aircraft (as of June 2008):
 5 Bombardier Dash 8 Q300
 14 Bombardier Dash 8 Q400

References

External links

 Air Nippon Network

Defunct airlines of Japan
All Nippon Airways
Airlines established in 2001
Airlines disestablished in 2010
Airline companies based in Tokyo
Japanese companies established in 2001
Japanese companies disestablished in 2010